Resizing (including miniaturization, growth, shrinking, and enlargement) is a recurring theme in fiction, in particular in fairy tales, fantasy, and science fiction. Resizing is often achieved through the consumption of mushrooms or toadstools, which might have been established due to their psychedelic properties, through magic, by inherent yet-latent abilities, or by size-changing rays of ambiguous properties.

See also
 Miniaturization – the redesign of products to make smaller ones
 Shapeshifting
 Shrink ray
 Square–cube law – a mathematical principle that defines why resizing is not possible in real life

References

Further reading
 Glassy, Mark C. The Biology of Science Fiction Cinema. Jefferson, N.C.: McFarland. 2001.

External links
 The Biology of B-Movie Monsters by Michael C. LaBarbera.

Fictional technology
Science fiction themes
 
 
Internet memes